Cyprus  participated the 2010 Summer Youth Olympics in Singapore.

Medalists

Athletics

Boys
Field Events

Girls
Field Events

Cycling 

Cross Country

Time Trial

BMX

Road Race

Overall

Gymnastics

Artistic Gymnastics

Boys

Swimming

References

External links
Competitors List: Cyprus

2010 in Cypriot sport
Nations at the 2010 Summer Youth Olympics
Cyprus at the Youth Olympics